The 2009 CERH Women's European League was the 3rd season of Europe's premier female club roller hockey competition organized by CERH.

Gijón conquered its second title after defeating CP Voltregà in the penalty shootout.

Results
The Final Four was played in Coutras, France. Eboli withdrew from the competition.

References

External links
 

CERH
Rink Hockey European Female League